Heather H. Hill is an American television director and producer. She is alternately credited as Heather Hill or Heather H. Hill.

Positions held
Supervising Producer on The Catlins; 1984
Director on Search for Tomorrow, General Hospital, Love of Life, As the World Turns, Baywatch; 1992, and The Young and the Restless; 1986 - 2000

Awards and nominations

Hill has been nominated for thirteen Daytime Emmy awards from 1988 to 2000, in the category Outstanding Drama Series Directing Team, for her work on The Young and the Restless. She won the award six times, in 1988, 1989, 1996, 1997, 1998, and 1999. Her first win was shared with Rudy Vejar, Frank Pacelli, Randy Robbins, and Betty Rothenberg.

References

External links

Living people
American television directors
American television producers
American women television producers
Emmy Award winners
American women television directors
Place of birth missing (living people)
Year of birth missing (living people)
21st-century American women